Fenimorea sunderlandi is a species of sea snail, a marine gastropod mollusk in the family Drilliidae.

Description
Original description: "Shell large for genus, elongated; body whorl and spire whorls rounded, without obvious shoulder; shell smooth, silky, without spiral grooves, threads, or other sculpture; body whorl with large, wide, swollen axial hump that is roughly 3 ribs in width; columella wide, well-developed; shell color pure white with single, wide, wine red band around mid-body; spire whorls with red band running along suture; interior of aperture white, with red band showing through from exterior."

The size of an adult shell varies between 20 mm and 40 mm.

Distribution
Locus typicus: "(Dredged from) 150 metres depth
50 kilometres South of Apalachicola, Florida, USA."

This species occurs in the demersal zone of the Gulf of Mexico; 
in the Atlantic Ocean between Florida and Brazil at depths between 61 m and 150 m.

References

 Rosenberg, G., F. Moretzsohn, and E. F. García. 2009. Gastropoda (Mollusca) of the Gulf of Mexico, Pp. 579–699 in Felder, D.L. and D.K. Camp (eds.), Gulf of Mexico–Origins, Waters, and Biota. Biodiversity. Texas A&M Press, College Station, Texas.
  Tucker, J.K. 2004 Catalog of recent and fossil turrids (Mollusca: Gastropoda). Zootaxa 682:1–1295

External links
 

sunderlandi
Gastropods described in 1987